Complete list of films produced by the Tollywood film industry based in Madras & Hyderabad in the year 1947.

References

External links
 Earliest Telugu language films at IMDb.com (103 to 107)

1947
Telugu
Telugu films